James Tyndale Mitchell (November 9, 1834 – July 4, 1915) was a justice of the Supreme Court of Pennsylvania from 1889 to 1903 and chief justice from 1903 to 1910.

Biography
James T. Mitchell was born on November 9, 1834 in Belleville, Illinois, to Edward P. Mitchell and Elizabeth Tyndale. He attended Zane Street Grammar School in Philadelphia, Pennsylvania, Central High School and Harvard University, graduating in 1855. He was later awarded an LL.D. degree from Harvard, in 1901. He studied law in the office of George W. Biddle and was admitted to the bar in November 1857. He received an LL.B. degree from the University of Pennsylvania Law School in 1860.

From 1859 until 1862, Mitchell served as assistant Philadelphia city solicitor under Charles E. Lex, after which he returned to private practice. He was elected to succeed George M. Stroud as a judge of the Philadelphia District Court in 1871, becoming a judge on the Court of Common Pleas following a reorganization of the courts. He was elected to the Supreme Court of Pennsylvania in November 1888 and assumed office as an associate justice in January 1889. He served in that office until becoming chief justice in 1903, serving until his retirement the beginning of 1910. He died on July 4, 1915.  He is interred at Laurel Hill Cemetery in Philadelphia.

During his career, Mitchell served as an overseer of Harvard University and was president of the Historical Society of Pennsylvania.

References

1834 births
1915 deaths
Justices of the Supreme Court of Pennsylvania
Pennsylvania lawyers
Harvard University alumni
University of Pennsylvania Law School alumni
19th-century American judges
19th-century American lawyers